Hugh Bethell (c. 1648 – 2 February 1717), of Rise, Yorkshire, was an English politician.

He was Mayor of Hedon in 1683–84. He was a Member (MP) of the Parliament of England for Hedon in the period 3 December 1695 – 1700.

References

1648 births
1717 deaths
Mayors of places in Yorkshire and the Humber
English MPs 1695–1698
English MPs 1698–1700
Members of the Parliament of England for Hedon
People from Holderness